Next Generation (NextGen) Data Communications (Nexcom or Data Comm), an element of the Next Generation Air Transportation System, will significantly reduce controller-to-pilot communications and controller workload, whilst improving safety. NextGen comprises complex integrated and interlinked programs, portfolios, systems, policies, and procedures. NextGen has modernized air traffic infrastructure in communications, navigation, surveillance, automation, and information management.

Description
In the current United States National Airspace System, all communications with airborne aircraft is by voice communications. Aircraft route of flight revisions must be communicated through multiple change-of-course instructions or lengthy verbal reroute instructions, which must be repeated; are prone to verbal communications errors; and entry errors into an aircraft's flight management system. The use of voice communication is labor and time intensive and will limit the ability of the Federal Aviation Administration (FAA) to effectively meet future traffic demand in the United States. 

Adding air-to-ground and ground-to-ground data communications will significantly reduce controller-to-pilot communications and controller workload. The data communications will enable ground automated message generation and receipt, message routing and transmission, and direct communications with aircraft avionics.

Initially, data communications will be an additional means for two-way exchange between controllers and flight crews for air traffic control clearances, instructions, advisories, flight crew requests and reports. Eventually, the majority of communications will be handled by data communications for appropriately equipped ground and airborne stations. Data communications will enable air traffic control to issue an entire route of a flight with a single data transmission directly to the aircraft's flight management system.

NexCom will be an eventual replacement for the existing Future Air Navigation System that is currently used primarily by transoceanic commercial airliners.

Benefits
Voice communications contribute to operational errors due to miscommunication, stolen clearances (an air traffic control clearance for one aircraft is heard and erroneously accepted by another aircraft) and delayed message transfers due to radio frequency congestion. Data communications will enable air traffic controller productivity improvements and will permit capacity growth without requisite growth in costs associated with infrastructure equipment, maintenance, labor and training. As a result, the resources required to provide air traffic management service per aircraft operation will decrease. The use of real-time aircraft data by ground systems to plot 4-dimensional trajectories (lateral and vertical navigation, ground speed and longitudinal navigation), and perform conformance management, will shift air traffic operations from  minute-by-minute tactical control, to more predictable and planned strategic traffic management.

See also
Controller–pilot data link communications (CPDLC)
Future Air Navigation System

References

External links
 FAA TV: DataComm – Quiet Communications Make-Over; Moving Aviation from Voice to Text (VIDEO)
 FAA NextGen Update and Progress report for Data Comm

Air traffic control systems
Aviation in the United States